Giorgio Morandi (July 20, 1890 – June 18, 1964) was an Italian painter and printmaker who specialized in still lifes. His paintings are noted for their tonal subtlety in depicting simple subjects, mainly vases, bottles, bowls, flowers, and landscapes.

Biography 

Giorgio Morandi was born in Bologna to Andrea Morandi and Maria Maccaferri. He lived first on Via Lame where his brother Giuseppe and his sister Anna were born. The family then moved to Via Avesella where two other sisters were born, Dina in 1900 and Maria Teresa in 1906. After the death of his father in 1909, the family moved to Via Fondazza and Morandi became the head of the family. 

From 1907 to 1913, he studied at the Accademia di Belle Arti di Bologna (Academy of Fine Arts of Bologna). At the Accademia, which based its traditions on 14th-century painting, Morandi taught himself to etch by studying books on Rembrandt. He was excellent at his studies, although his professors disapproved of the changes in his style during his final two years at the Accademia. 

In 1910, he visited Florence, where the works of artists such as Giotto, Masaccio, Piero della Francesca, and Paolo Uccello made a profound impression on him. He had a brief digression into a Futurist style in 1914. In that same year, Morandi was appointed instructor of drawing for elementary schools in Bologna—a post he held until 1929. Morandi was influenced by the works of Cézanne, Derain, and Picasso. 

In 1915, he joined the army but had a breakdown and was indefinitely discharged. During World War I, Morandi's still life paintings became more reduced in their compositional elements and purer in form, revealing his admiration for both Cézanne and Henri "Le Douanier" Rousseau.

Morandi practiced metaphysical painting from 1918 to 1922. This was his last major stylistic shift; thereafter, he focused increasingly on subtle gradations of hue, tone, and objects arranged in a unifying atmospheric haze, establishing the direction his art was to take for the rest of his life. Morandi showed in the Novecento Italiano exhibitions of 1926 and 1929, but was more specifically associated with the regional Strapaese group by the end of the decade, a fascist-influenced group emphasizing local cultural traditions. He was sympathetic to the Fascist party in the 1920s, although his friendships with anti-Fascist figures led authorities to arrest him briefly in 1943. 

From 1928, Morandi exhibited his work in both Italian and foreign cities. He participated in some of the Venice Biennale exhibitions—where, in 1948, he won first prize for painting—and in the Rome Quadriennale. In 1929, he illustrated the work  by Vincenzo Cardarelli, winner of the Premio Bagutta. From 1930 to 1956, Morandi was a professor of etching at Accademia di Belle Arti. He visited Paris for the first time in 1956, and in 1957 he won the grand prize at the São Paulo Art Biennial.

Quiet and polite, both in his private and public life, Morandi was much talked about in Bologna for his enigmatic yet very optimistic personality. He lived on Via Fondazza, in Bologna, with his three sisters: Anna, Dina, and Maria Teresa.

Morandi died of lung cancer on June 18, 1964. He is buried in the Certosa di Bologna in the family tomb together with his three sisters. On the tomb is a portrait of him by Giacomo Manzù.

Legacy 
Throughout his career, Morandi concentrated almost exclusively on still lifes and landscapes, except for a few self-portraits. With great sensitivity to tone, color, and compositional balance, he would depict the same familiar bottles and vases again and again in paintings notable for their simplicity of execution. A prolific painter, he completed some 1,350 oil paintings. He also executed 133 etchings, a significant body of work in its own right, and his drawings and watercolors often approach abstraction in their economy of means. He explained: "What interests me most is expressing what's in nature, in the visible world, that is."

Morandi was perceived as one of the few Italian artists of his generation to have escaped the taint of fascism, and to have evolved a style of pure pictorial values congenial to modernist abstraction. Through his simple and repetitive motifs and economical use of color, value, and surface, Morandi became a prescient and important forerunner of Minimalism.

He has been written about by Philippe Jaccottet, Jean Leymarie, Jean Clair, Yves Bonnefoy, Roberto Longhi, Cesare Brandi, Lambeto Vitali, Luigi Magnani, Marilena Pasquali, and many other critics.

In popular culture 
Federico Fellini paid tribute to Morandi in his 1960 film La Dolce Vita, which featured Morandi's paintings, as does the film La Notte by Michelangelo Antonioni. One of the main characters in Sarah Hall's novel How to Paint a Dead Man is loosely based on Morandi. Don DeLillo's novel Falling Man includes two Morandi still-life paintings on the wall of character Nina's New York apartment, as well as "a show of Morandi paintings at a gallery in Chelsea" at the beginning of Chapter 12. Morandi was a particular favorite of eccentric Scottish poet Ivor Cutler, who included a poem about the painter in his first anthology Many Flies Have Feathers (1973).

In 1993, the Giorgio Morandi Museum was founded by Franco Solmi (director of the Galleria d'Arte Moderna, Bologna, at the time) and the Bologna Municipality. Morandi's works and atelier, which were owned by his family, were donated to the museum by his sister Maria Teresa Morandi. The Centro Studi Giorgio Morandi and its president, Marilena Pasquali, also contributed to the museum's foundation. Today the museum includes a reconstruction of Morandi's studio.

Two oil paintings by Morandi were chosen by US President Barack Obama in 2009 and are now part of the White House Collection.

Exhibitions

Although Morandi was not greatly concerned with exhibitions during his own lifetime, his works have been subsequently displayed in the Museo d'Arte Moderna di Bologna (MAMbo) and many other cities. From April 30, 1998, the exhibition "The Later Morandi. Still Lifes 1950–1964", curated by Laura Mattioli Rossi, was inaugurated at the Peggy Guggenheim Museum in Venice, at first held at Galleria dello Scudo, Verona, in winter 1997–98.

In December 2008, an exhibition dedicated to Morandi was held at the Metropolitan Museum of Art in New York City. In 2010, twenty-one works were shown at the Museo Fortuny in Venice, curated by the director Daniela Ferretti and Franco Calarota. 
From June 7 until September 22, 2013, a Morandi exhibition was held at the Centre for Fine Arts in Brussels, Belgium (with guest artist Luc Tuymans).

In 2014–15, Ettore Spalletti exhibited his works in dialogue with Morandi's at Galleria d'Arte Maggiore g.a.m. in Bologna; the show was curated by Franco and Roberta Calarota. In 2015, the David Zwirner Gallery had an exhibition of Morandi's work in New York. Between October 9 and June 25, 2016, the Center for Italian Modern Art in New York held an exhibition featuring paintings, etchings, and drawings by Morandi. From May 19 to July 4, 2021, an exhibition dedicated to Morandi took place at the Museum of Grenoble.

As subject of photography
Some of the most famous photographers of the 20th century took photographs of Morandi at his house on Via Fondazza, at Grizzana Morandi's house, and at the Venice Biennale. Among those who photographed Morandi or his studio were Herbert List, Duane Michals, Jean Francois Bauret, Paolo Prandi, Paolo Ferrari, Lamberto Vitali, Libero Grandi, Franz Hubmann, Leo Lionni, Antonio Masotti, Carlo Ludovico Ragghianti, Lee Miller, Giancolombo, Ugo Mulas, Luigi Ghirri, Gianni Berengo Gardin, and Luciano Calzolari.

The filmmaker Tacita Dean filmed the inside of Morandi's house on Via Fondazza. An exhibition of stills from one of the two films, Still Life, was held at the Center for Italian Modern Art, in New York, in 2016.

In 2016, the American photographer Joel Meyerowitz published Morandi's Objects, a book with photographs of more than 260 objects that the painter had collected during his life.

Notes

References
Abramowicz, Janet (2004), Giorgio Morandi: The Art of Silence, New Haven, [Conn.]: Yale University Press. 
Bell, Jane (1982), "Messages in Bottles: the Noble Grandeur of Giorgio Morandi", ARTnews, March 1982: 114–117
Bandera, Maria Cristina and Miracco, Renato (eds) (2008), Giorgio Morandi 1890-1964, exh. cat. (New York, Metropolitan Museum of Art, 2008–2009), Milan.
Cowling, Elizabeth and Mundy, Jennifer (1990), On Classic Ground: Picasso, Léger, de Chirico and the New Classicism 1910–1930, London: Tate Gallery. 
Morandi, Giorgio (1988), Morandi, New York: Rizzoli. 
Pasquali, Marilena (2008), "Giorgio Morandi: saggi e ricerche 1990-2007", Florence: Noèdizioni
Vitali, Lamberto (1977), Morandi: Catalogo Generale, 2 vols, Milan: Electa.

Further reading
 Coldwell, Paul (2006), Morandi's Legacy: Influences on British Art. I.B. Tauris. 
 Hustvedt, Siri (2005), Mysteries of the Rectangle: Chapter 7, "Giorgio Morandi: Not Just Bottles."

External links

Museo Morandi

1890 births
1964 deaths
Italian educators
Italian etchers
Italian Futurist painters
20th-century Italian painters
Italian male painters
Italian still life painters
Modern painters
Painters from Bologna
20th-century printmakers
Deaths from lung cancer in Emilia-Romagna
20th-century Italian male artists